Albert de Saint-Albin (1843, in Paris – 18 December 1901, in Paris) was a 19th-century French playwright, journalist, chansonnier and librettist.

Biography 

A journalist at Le Temps, chief editor of the Jockey (1866) and the Le Figaro (1880), he was known as a sports columnist under the pseudonym Robert Milton and was a great promoter of fencing.

His plays were presented on the most important Parisian stages of the 19th century, including the Théâtre des Variétés, the Théâtre du Palais-Royal, the Théâtre du Vaudeville, and the Théâtre de la Gaîté.

Moreover, Saint-Albin was a great collector of paintings by Eugène Boudin of which he owned a dozen works and by Gustave Moreau.

Works

Theatre 
1875: Le Manoir de Pictordu, comédie-opérette in 3 acts, with Arnold Mortier
1876: La Belle Poule, three-act opéra bouffe, with Hector Crémieux
1877: La Foire Saint-Laurent, three-act opéra bouffe, with Crémieux and Jacques Offenbach
1879: Le Grand Casimir, three-act opérette, with Jules Prével and Charles Lecocq
1884: Le Train de plaisir, four-act comedy, with Alfred Hennequin and Mortier
1885: Mam'zelle Gavroche, comédie-opérette, with Edmond Gondinet
1885: Monsieur le Député, one-act comedy
1888: Les Joyeusetés de l'année
1891: Monsieur l'abbé ou la Belle-mère apprivoisée
1893: Leurs gigolettes
1895: Panurge, opéra comique, with Robert Planquette and Henri Meilhac
1906: Le Péril jaune, three-act comedy, with Alexandre Bisson, posth.

Sport 
1875: Les Salles d'armes de Paris
1875: Le Sportman
1889: Les sports à Paris, 2 vol.
1889: Les cirques
1890: Les courses de chevaux en France, Hachette
1899: Les Courses de lévriers, le coursing, greyhounds et fox-terriers by Alfred de Sauvenière, preface
undated: À travers les salles d'armes

Songs 
1874: Le Langage des yeux !, with Prével et Lecocq
1874: Les Oiseaux en cage, with Auguste Coédès
1878: Pas de récompense. Plaintes d'une Parisienne, with Coédès
1885: Barcarolle d'Asnières
1894: L'Ascenseur !

Bibliography 
 Henri Avenel, La presse française au vingtième siècle, 1901, p. 435
 Manuel Gómez García, Diccionario Akal de Teatro, 1998, p. 745
 Jacques Marchand, Les défricheurs de la presse sportive, 1999, p. 98
 Kurt Gänzl, The encyclopedia of the musical theatre, 2001, p. 1778

References

External links 
 Albert de Saint-Albin on 
 Albert de Saint-Albin on The Online Books Page
 Les sports à Paris on Gallica

19th-century French dramatists and playwrights
19th-century French journalists
French male journalists
French sports journalists
French chansonniers
French opera librettists
1843 births
Writers from Paris
1901 deaths
19th-century French male writers